Claus E. Rolfs (born 1941 in Bad Peterstal) is a German experimental physicist, known for his laboratory research related to nuclear astrophysics.

Biography
Rolfs went to school in Offenburg and studied physics at the University of Freiburg. From 1973 he was a close associate of William A. Fowler at Caltech, where Rolfs was a Millikan Fellow. In the 1970s and 1980s Rolfs was a professor at the University of Münster. He was a professor at the Ruhr University Bochum from 1990 to 2007, when he retired as professor emeritus. He lives in Münster. In 1980 he was a visiting professor at Ohio State University.

Rolfs has collaborated in many laboratory experiments that collect data on the nuclear fusion reactions that also take place in the Sun.

Beginning in 2005 he considered radical, new ideas concerning the treatment of radioactive waste. In 2006 he and his team published the highly controversial indications of their experiments involving beta-decay. Rolfs claimed that "by encasing certain radioisotopes in metal and chilling them close to absolute zero, it ought to be possible to slash their half-lives from millennia to just a few years." However, the alleged change in half-life has been disconfirmed by subsequent experiments. The uranium isotope ratios are also identical in various uranium ore deposits worldwide, indicating that, in the natural history of planet Earth, the half-lives of uranium's radioactive isotopes are significantly influenced by neither the temperature nor the chemical environment — although isotopic signatures can be affected by "reduction of uranium to UO2 or chemical precipitation in the form of U6+ minerals."

Claus Rolfs is the author or co-author of over 450 articles and is also the author of several books in German for young people.

In 1972 he was the representative of Canada at the IAEA in Vienna. In 1979 he received the Roentgen Prize of the University of Gießen. He has several honorary doctorates (Naples, Catania, Lisbon). In 2006 he received the Saha Memorial Prize in Calcutta and in 1989 the Belgian-German Humboldt Prize. In 2010 he received the Hans A. Bethe Prize for "seminal contributions to the experimental determination of nuclear cross-sections in stars, including the first direct measurement of the key 3He fusion reaction at solar conditions.".

Rolfs plays several musical instruments.

His doctoral students include Michael Wiescher.

Selected publications

Articles
 
 
 
 
 
 
  (Nucleosynthesis in homogeneous and inhomogeneous Big Bang models}
 
 
  (The celestial source of energy: how does the sun work? The history of the chemical elements)
 
 
 
 
 
  (From the hummingbird to the whale; discussion of the physics of animals)

Books
 
 Auf ins Weltall – ein Wegbegleiter für Jung und Alt. Wagner Verlag, Gelnhausen 2009,  (Out into space — an introductory guide for young and old)
 Wie Biosphäre und Medizin die Physik verwenden. Wagner Verlag, Gelnhausen 2009,  (How biosphere and medicine use physics)
 Was man so über Energie wissen sollte. Wagner Verlag, Gelnhausen 2009,  (What you should know about energy)
 Schall bei Mensch und Tier und die Kunst der Musik. Verlag Die Blaue Eule, Essen 2009,  (Sound in humans and animals and the art of music)

References

External links
  (search on Person "Rolfs")

1941 births
Living people
University of Freiburg alumni
Academic staff of the University of Münster
Academic staff of Ruhr University Bochum
20th-century German physicists
21st-century German physicists
German nuclear physicists
German astrophysicists
People from Ortenaukreis